Ulogie is a rural locality in the Shire of Banana, Queensland, Australia.

History 
The locality name derives from the railway station name assigned by the Queensland Railways Department on 9 October 1914, supposedly a name of Scottish origin.

References 

Shire of Banana
Localities in Queensland